Vaux-de-Cernay Abbey was a Cistercian monastery in northern France (Ile-de-France), situated in Cernay-la-Ville, in the Diocese of Versailles, Yvelines.

History
The abbey was founded in 1118 when Simon de Neauffle and his wife Eve donated the land for this foundation to the monks of Savigny Abbey, in order to have a monastery built in honour of the Mother of God and Saint John the Baptist. Vital, Abbot of Savigny, accepted their offer, and sent a group of monks under the direction of Arnaud, who became their first abbot. Besides the founders, others of the nobility came to the aid of the new Savigniac community.

As soon as the abbey was well established, many postulants were admitted, thus making possible in 1137 the foundation of Le Breuil-Benoît Abbey in the Diocese of Evreux. In 1148 Vaux-de-Cernay, together with the entire Congregation of Savigny, entered the Order of Cîteaux and became an affiliation of Clairvaux Abbey. From this time on they prospered, building a church in the simple Cistercian style. Over time, additional buildings were constructed, as well as a mill, and a fish farm.

Abbots
Many of its abbots became well known. Andrew, the fourth, died as Bishop of Arras. Guy of Vaux-de-Cernay, the sixth, was delegated by the General Chapter to accompany the Fourth Crusade in 1203. Three years later he was one of the principal figures in the Albigensian Crusade, which fought against the Cathars. In recognition of his service he was made Bishop of Carcassonne (1211) and is commemorated in the Cistercian Menology. His nephew Peter of Vaux-de-Cernay, also a monk of the abbey, accompanied him on this crusade, and left a chronicle of the Cathars and the war against them.

It was under Thomas, Peter's successor, that Porrois Abbey, a Cistercian nunnery, later renamed the Abbey of Port-Royal, was founded and placed under the direction of the abbots of Vaux-de-Cernay. The ninth abbot, Thibault de Marley (1235–47), a descendant of the Montmorency family, was canonized.

Towards the end of the fourteenth century the monastery began losing its fervour, both on account of its wealth and because of the disturbed state of the Île-de-France during the Hundred Years' War. After the introduction of commendatory abbots in 1542 there was little left of the monastic community beyond the name. In the seventeenth century the community was restored in spirit by embracing the Reform of the Strict Observance as promoted by Denis Largentier. During this time the commendatory abbot was John Casimir, King of Poland. The monastery was suppressed in 1791 during the French Revolution and its members (twelve priests) were  dispersed.

Recent history
The buildings, after passing through various hands, were partly restored after the site was bought by Charlotte de Rothschild in the 1880s, who saved the ruins of the church and part of the buildings, fully restoring the abbey.

Today the buildings are used as a hotel with a capacity for 1,200 persons, complete with restaurant and heliport, but still using the nearby spring as the monks did centuries before.

See also
Abbé Adam

Footnotes

References
Gallia Christiana, VII; 
 Caspar Jongelinus, Notitia Abbatiarum, O. Cisterciensis (Cologne, 1640); 
Bertrand Tissier, Bibliotheca Patrum Cisterciensium, VII (Paris, 1669); 
Merlet and Moutier, Cartulaire de l'Abbaye de N. D. des Vaux-de-Cernay, I-III (Paris, 1857–58); 
Morize, Étude archéologique sur l'Abbaye des Vaux-de-Cernay with introduction by de Dion (Tours, 1889); 
De Dion, Cartulaire de Porrois plus connue sous le nom mystique de Port-Royal (Paris, 1903); 
Charles Beaunier, Recueil historique des archévechés, évechés, abbayes et prieurés de France, province ecclesiastique de Paris (Paris, 1905); 
Angel Manrique, Annales Cistercienses (Lyons, 1642–59); 
Edmond Martène and Ursin Durand, Veterum Scriptorum et Monumentorum amplissima collectio, II (Paris, 1724); 
Petrus Sarniensis, Historia Albigensium (Troyes, 1615); 
Leopold Janauschek, Originum Cisterciensium, I (Vienna, 1877).

External links
 Photos page
  Cartulary online (Latin, French notes)

1118 establishments in Europe
1110s establishments in France
Cistercian monasteries in France
Religious organizations established in the 1110s
Christian monasteries established in the 12th century
Hotels in France
Rothschild family residences